Bachelor Gaye is an Australian television sitcom which first screened on the Nine Network in 1971. Lazy bachelor Sid Gaye moves in with his sister and her family, causing chaos.

Production
Bachelor Gaye was supposed to run for 13 episodes and eight episodes were filmed but the series was short-lived when the Nine Network decided to axe it after five episodes. The series was written by Ralph Peterson.

Cast
 John Meillon as Sid Gaye
 Jane Coghlan
 Al Thomas

See also
 List of Australian television series

References

External links

1971 Australian television series debuts
1971 Australian television series endings
Australian television sitcoms
Nine Network original programming
Black-and-white Australian television shows
English-language television shows